Bruce Murray may refer to:

Bruce C. Murray (1931–2013), American planetary scientist
Bruce Murray (cricketer) (1940–2023), New Zealand cricketer
Bruce Murray (footballer, born 1933) (1933–1981), Australian rules footballer for Geelong and St Kilda
Bruce Murray (soccer) (born 1966), American soccer player
Bruce Murray (sportscaster) (born 1963), American radio sportscaster
Bruce Murray (sportsman) (1929–2020), Australian cricketer and footballer for South Melbourne
Bruce Murray, 12th Duke of Atholl (born 1960), South African-born hereditary peer